Wender is both a surname and a given name. Notable people with the given name include:

Given name
Wender Coelho da Silva (born 1982), commonly known as Teco, a Brazilian footballer
Wenderson Arruda Said (born 1975), commonly known as Wender, is a retired Brazilian footballer

Surname
DJ Wender (born 1973), real name Vincenzo Giannatempo, better known as Wender or Mago Wender, Italian DJ
Johann Friedrich Wender (1655–1729), German organ builder

See also
Wender., taxonomic author abbreviation for Georg Wilhelm Franz Wenderoth (1774–1861), German pharmacist and botanist
Wender Taxol total synthesis